Ozerlag (Озерлаг) was an MVD special camp (osoblag No. 7, osoby lager No. 7) in the Soviet GULAG labor camp system for political prisoners. It was established in 1948 near Taishet and included a chain of camp sites (lagernye punkty) along the Baikal-Amur Mainline branches constructed by the inmates, up to Bratsk and later further to Ust-Kut.

Notable detainees
Jazep Hermanovich and Andrej Cikota, Belarusian Catholic priests
Hava Volovich
Victor Krasin
Sergei Wojciechowski
Algirdas Petrusevičius
Manfred Stern

Lidia Ruslanova
Hugo Raudsepp

References

MVD special camps